St. Mary's By the River is a historic building at 3855 River Road in Moss Point, Mississippi.

It was built in 1929 and added to the National Register of Historic Places in 1991.

References

Houses on the National Register of Historic Places in Mississippi
Tudor Revival architecture in Mississippi
Houses completed in 1929
National Register of Historic Places in Jackson County, Mississippi